Nevin Frederick Paynter (1 June 1930 – 28 April 1981) was an Australian rules footballer who played with Melbourne in the Victorian Football League (VFL).

Family
The son of Frederick Paynter (1903-1967), and Ruby May Paynter (1903-1990), née Martin, Nevin Frederick Paynter was born at Bentleigh, Victoria on 1 June 1930.

Death
He died at Warrnambool on 28 April 1981.

Notes

References

External links 
 
 
 Nevin Paynter profile at Demonwiki

1930 births
1981 deaths
Australian rules footballers from Melbourne
Melbourne Football Club players
People from Bentleigh, Victoria